Professor Mamlock may refer to: 

Professor Mamlock (play), a 1933 theater drama by Friedrich Wolf
Professor Mamlock (1938 film), a Soviet film based on the play, directed by Herbert Rappaport
Professor Mamlock (1961 film), an East German film based on the play, directed by Friedrich's son, Konrad Wolf